Marko Mitrović (Serbian Cyrillic: Марко Митровић; born 8 July 1978) is a Serbian football coach. A versatile midfielder, he could operate as a holding midfielder or a box to box player and spent most of his professional career in Serbia where he represented eight clubs. Other than in his own country, Mitrović also played professionally in Hungary, Azerbaijan, and Kazakhstan. He is the head coach of the United States U19 national team.

Playing career

Club
Mitrović was a member of the Red Star Belgrade academy for several years, before signing his first professional contract with the club. He made his professional debut for Red Star Belgrade on 6 April 1996 against Novi Sad in a second game of the FR Yugoslavia Cup semifinals at the age of 17.

The next three seasons he spent on loan at FK Voždovac, FK Budućnost Valjevo and FK Milicionar. With FK Milicionar, he got promoted to the Super League during the 1997–98 season.

After leaving Red Star in summer 1999 he played for FK Zemun for 6 months. His next station was FK Radnički Kragujevac where he spent the 2000–01 season before he moved to Vasas SC, in the Hungarian Premier League, where he spent the 2001–02 season.

In 2002–03 he was signed by FK Budućnost Banatski Dvor. The club won the Second League in his first year and got promoted to the First League. In 2003–04 they played the Cup Final vs Red Star. They lost 0–1 but the club qualified for UEFA Cup.

In summer 2005 he moved to Olimpik Baku, Azerbaijan Premier League, where he spent one year, from 2005-06.

In July 2006 he joined Banat Zrenjanin for another 18 months.

In January 2008 he signed for FC Atyrau. After 6 months he got transferred to FC Megasport. They were members of the Kazakhstan Premier League. At the end of 2008, they merged with Alma-Ata to form Lokomotiv Astana (today known as FC Astana). In December 2009 he left the club based on the league’s new rules that foreigners older than 30 years old cannot be signed by Kazakhstan Premier League Clubs.

Spring 2010 he spent with Smederevo playing in Serbian Super League before he announced retirement from a professional playing career.

International
Mitrović represented the FR Yugoslavia national under-18 football team in 1995.

Coaching career
In summer 2011 he started his coaching career with his former club FK Banat Zrenjanin as an assistant coach under Milan Budisavljević in Serbian First League. In January 2012 he joined FK Napredak Kruševac as an assistant coach under former Red Star Belgrade head coach Aleksandar Kristić.

In summer 2012 he joined Veljko Paunović as first assistant coach for Serbia U-18, U-19, and U-20 national teams. Under his involvement the Serbian national team had the following accomplishments:

 First place at the FIFA U20 World Cup in New Zealand (2015),
 Third place a UEFA European Championship in Hungary (2014),
 First place at Elite Round,
 First place at UEFA Qualifiers - First Round in Serbia (2013).
Some players were promoted to Serbia National Team like Sergej Milinković-Savić, Nemanja Maksimović, Marko Grujić, Luka Jović, Andrija Živković, Miloš Veljković, Predrag Rajković, Mijat Gaćinović.

In summer 2013 he was in charge for Red Star Belgrade Youth Academy U-15 and U-16 Team. He won the First place in the season 2013/14 in Serbian U-15 League. Players like Luka Ilić, Dejan Joveljić, Aleksa Terzić, Vladan Djekic and others were part of that generation and Mitrović had an important role in their selection and development.

From December 2014 to December 2015 he was the head coach of Serbia U-15 national team. Some players were promoted to Serbia national team like Sergej Milinković-Savić, Nemanja Maksimović, Marko Grujić, Luka Jović, Andrija Živković, Miloš Veljković, Predrag Rajković, and Mijat Gaćinović.

In January 2016 he was signed by Chicago Fire FC (MLS) as an assistant coach with Veljko Paunović as a head coach. He spent 4 years with the Chicago Fire, from January 2016 to November 2019.

In August 2017, he was assistant coach for MLS ALL Star Team vs Real Madrid.

During his time with the Chicago Fire he had a chance to work with many national team players such as: Bastian Schweinsteiger, Nicolás Gaitán, Aleksandar Katai, Nemanja Nikolić, David Accam, Dax McCarty, Djordje Mihailovic, Przemysław Frankowski, Francisco Calvo, Nicolas Hasler, Cristian Martínez, and Răzvan Cociș.

Personal life
He is married and with his wife Marija have three children Mitar, Matija and Mia. He is fluent in four languages: English, Spanish, Serbian and Russian. In 1997 he graduated from the Mathematical Grammar School in Belgrade.

References

External links

 Profile at Srbijafudbal
 
 Profile and stats until 2003 at Dekisa.Tripod

1978 births
Living people
Footballers from Belgrade
Serbian footballers
Association football midfielders
Red Star Belgrade footballers
FK Voždovac players
FK Zemun players
Vasas SC players
FK Budućnost Banatski Dvor players
AZAL PFK players
FK Banat Zrenjanin players
FC Megasport players
FC Astana players
FK Smederevo players
Yugoslav First League players
Yugoslav Second League players
Serbian SuperLiga players
Azerbaijan Premier League players
Kazakhstan Premier League players
Serbia youth international footballers
Serbian expatriate footballers
Serbian expatriate sportspeople in Hungary
Serbian expatriate sportspeople in Azerbaijan
Serbian expatriate sportspeople in Kazakhstan
Expatriate footballers in Hungary
Expatriate footballers in Azerbaijan
Expatriate footballers in Kazakhstan
Serbian football managers
Chicago Fire FC non-playing staff
Reading F.C. non-playing staff
English Football League managers
Serbian expatriate football managers
Serbian expatriate sportspeople in the United States
Expatriate soccer managers in the United States